Tony Steratore has been an American football official in the National Football League (NFL) since the 2000 NFL season, who wears uniform number 112. He currently works as a back judge. For the 2020 NFL season, Steratore was scheduled to be the back judge on the officiating crew headed by referee Jerome Boger. He is a native of the Pittsburgh suburb of Washington, Pennsylvania.  Former NFL referee Gene Steratore Jr. is his younger brother.  His father, Gene Steratore Sr., was an official in both college football and basketball.  He officiated two Super Bowl games, which were Super Bowl XXXIX in Jacksonville, Florida, and Super Bowl XLVI in Indianapolis.

Outside of his NFL officiating duties, Tony Steratore is the president of Steratore Sanitary Supplies in Washington, Pennsylvania; his younger brother Gene is vice-president.

Steratore chose to opt out of the 2020 NFL season due to the COVID-19 pandemic.

References

Living people
People from Washington, Pennsylvania
National Football League officials
21st-century American businesspeople
Year of birth missing (living people)